is a Japanese light novel series written by Tsuyoshi Yoshioka and illustrated by Seiji Kikuchi. It began serialization online in January 2015 on the user-generated novel publishing website Shōsetsuka ni Narō. At the beginning of edisode 311, in November of 2022, it was announced that episode would be the last posted on Shōsetsuka ni Narō.  It was acquired by Enterbrain, who have published seventeen volumes since July 2015 under their Famitsu Bunko imprint. 

A manga adaptation with illustration by Shunsuke Ogata began serialization on Kadokawa Shoten's Young Ace Up website from March 2016. It has been collected in twenty-one tankōbon volumes. 

An anime television series adaptation by Silver Link aired from April to June 2019.

Plot
A young salaryman who died in an accident was reborn in another world filled with magic and demons. As a baby, he was picked up by the patriot hero "Sage" Merlin Wolford and was given the name Shin. He was raised as a grandson and soaked up Merlin's teachings, earning him some irresistible powers. However, when Shin became 15, Merlin realized, "I forgot to teach him common sense!" Diseum, king of the Earlshide Kingdom, recommends Shin to attend his Magic Academy, on the agreement of not using Shin for political warfare. In the capital, Shin rescues two girls, Maria and Sizilien, from thugs, and later he would inaugurate a club that consists of him and others.

Characters

Ultimate Magic Research Society

A Japanese salary-man who worked for a science textbook publisher, was killed by a truck and reborn into another world with his memories intact. Upon arriving into the new world which was full of magic, he was raised and trained by Merlin Wolford, Melida Bowen, and Michel Collins, thereby making his magical and combat skills beyond S-rank. Shin can also create and modify magical gear to what can be considered National Treasure level equipment. Being raised in the woods, however, his social and worldly skills are a bit lacking. He has the leadership of his own Ultimate Magic Research Society and effortlessly tops S-rank. Sicily was enamored with Shin from their first meeting and is overjoyed when she becomes his fiancée. Like his grandfather, Shin can cast magic without verbal or somatic components (since he considers aloud spell names embarrassing) and has created many unique spells like the gate and extra-dimensional storage spaces. His element compress in water & heat and his strongest arsenal is Hydrogen Bomb. Based on the recollection of his previous world, Shin's knowledge of science and astronomy revolutionize the world's magic tools. Over the summer break, Shin and his grandparents did intensive training with the Ultimate Magic Research Society to prepare for massive demon outbreaks while deployed in a special unit called the Ultimate Magicians, hopefully, to prevent other academy students from getting conscript into war. Soon afterward, Shin's (Earth-modern) appliances prompted him to open his own shopping mall. His title is Demon Lord, which he does not like. 

The son of King Diseum and invested as the crown prince, he also goes by "Aug" or "Gus" to his friends. He is respected by his peers and, like his father, considers one's abilities to take precedent over their peerage, but does not use his influence unless necessary. Aug inherited his father's traits. Shin and Aug have a cousin-like relationship. Aug enjoys watching when Shin gets in over his head during social actions and likes to tease Shin to act on his plan. He also keeps Shin prudent from introducing new magic and tools that would throw the world out of balance. Aug's childhood friends, Julius and Thor, feel pressured because he talks to Shin casually. Even Elizabeth is irritated by their closeness until Aug eases her mind when he provokes Shin to confess to Sicily. He acquired the title 'Thunder God' after electrocuting a giant crocodile and is the 2nd S-rank.

 
A red-haired second daughter of a Countess and is a friend to Sicily. Maria is very upfront and vocal lady; she is also an obsessive fangirl of Merlin and Melida. She teases Sicily over her crush on Shin and tries to offer her support in their relationship. Due to her indifference, Shin does not treat her like a nobleman's daughter. Her title is Valkyrie and is the 3rd S-rank. She does not like her title as it implies she will be a virgin for the rest of her life and never get married.

A beautiful, timid; soft-spoken girl with waist length blue hair being called a Saint, and is the third daughter and fourth child of the Viscount Claude, who works at the Finance Bureau. She gets her looks from her mother. Her eldest sibling is her brother Royce, the heir presumptive of the noble house, along with her two sisters Cecilia and Sylvia, who both work for the Royal Magic Division. Sicily is unassuming with what many consider the loveliest features. She is smitten with Shin the first time she meets him after he rescues her and Maria from a group of thugs. As she and Shin started going out she tends to be a little aggressive towards him and others. Sicily excels in healing magic and thanks to Shin's tutoring her forte is now only second best to Shin's. She is the 4th S-rank and received the title 'Holy Maiden' for being a savior of Swedes Kingdom civilians increasing her popularity, including her and Shin's engagement. She's now targeted by Zest and his scouts, as she is deemed to be Shin's weakness.

A perky blonde girl who has an upbeat, yet childish personality, and her father is an accountant of the Hague Company. Despite being considered an adult (15) Alice is also the smallest physically. She is marked 5th S-rank. Alice's father accepted the position of President at the Wolford Company. After seeing many of her friends getting impressive titles, she asked for one as well, she got one and it is called 'Eradication Magical <Petite> Girl', a title which she does not really like at all.

 
A childhood friend of Prince August and acts as one of his escorts with seriousness. Thor has silver-colored hair and eyeglasses. He is the eldest son of a Baron. Thor longs to be knighted though some people are puzzled by his appearance. Initially, he and Julius do not chat equally with Aug, until seeing him and Shin interacting without any care of their status, and gains more confidence over time. He is marked 6th S-rank.

A petite girl, slightly taller than Alice and sports glasses, and her father is a court magician. Lynn is excited to gather magic when it comes to Shin's tutelage. Due to her uncontrollable magic, Shin dubs her the 'Unbridled Magical Girl', something she appears to be delighted of, though it wasn't a compliment. Given the name, she is marked 7th S-rank.

 
A curvaceous figure student whose family runs an inn. She is personally taught by her idol Melida, making her hailed as the ‘Guru's Successor.’ Yuri dresses in her shirt hung loosely that slightly exposes her large breasts. Her specialty is Enchantment magic. She is marked 8th S-rank.

 
A handsome boy from a family of knights however he decided to attend an academy for magicians. Tony is a laid-back person who usually just goes with the flow. He does not respect the environment of knights and is more interested in flirting with girls. He chose to attend the Magic Academy over the Knight Academy due to the larger number of girls at the Magic Academy. Tony is one of the few magicians who excelled in swordplay other than Shin. He is marked 9th S-rank. He acquired the title 'Knight Magician' after he defeated a giant demon deer with magic and swordsmanship.

Also a childhood friend of Prince August and serves as his escort along with Thor. Julius has a muscular body and is the eldest son of a Duke. His relationship with Aug is similar to Thor's and changed afterward. Julius also speaks in a samurai tone that Shin mistakes him for a real knight until he invites the whole group to his family beach resort. He is marked 10th S-rank.

He is a sporting boy being in a family that works as blacksmiths. Mark is Olivia's boyfriend. He is good friends with the S-class regardless of being a newcomer. His father is a strict man who keeps his staff organized, although he immediately results in politeness to the nobility, such as August or Shin. Mark is willing to implement Shin's ideas of inventing detach swords and wireless communication devices empowered with his manmade gem stones. Originally an A-class student he qualified to be in Shin's club by making an inter-dimensional storage space. Mark's magic has improved so much from Shin's tutoring that he and Olivia are officially placed in the S-class, ranking 11th and 12th respectively.

She is an attractive lady whose family runs a popular restaurant and is Mark's girlfriend. Olivia started as an A-class student along with Mark. She and Mark are the only other students in the Academy able to create an inter-dimensional storage space, thereby being able to join Shin's club activity. However, she and Mark have since been upgraded to S-class due to having improved their magical powers.

Supporting characters

The Wise Man and adopted grandfather of Shin. A hero of the Kingdom whose magic and skills are considered legendary especially when he and Melida (whom he was married to at the time) slew the Demonoid king. Everywhere they go they have rabid fans pursuing them and are considered the epitome of greatness. However, while teaching Shin magic and combat, his training in common sense and otherworldly events was a bit sparse.

The Great Guru and ex-wife to Merlin. Melida helped raise Shin and taught him the skill of gear creation, being one of the greatest creators of all time. While stern, she cares greatly for Shin and is always amazed when he does something inventive; if not angered, as Shin has a tendency to do things without thinking about it responsibly. She also is working to teach Shin some common sense and ensure he is not taken advantage of.

The current king of the Earlshide Kingdom. Diseum's personality is lax and prefers to be called Uncle Dis by Shin as he himself sees Shin as his own nephew. In his days at the Magic Academy, the student body was conscripted in the subjugation of the first Demonoid. The calamity brought near extinction to the Earlshide Kingdom and Diseum witnessed it all till Merlin and Melida arrive to combat and defeat the threat. Since then, Diseum befriended the duo after they are hailed as heroes. After Diseum graduated from the academy, he accompanied Merlin Wolford and Melinda Bowen to live a vagabond life. Because he was treated as an apprentice or rather, a maid, the two treats him with little respect. Apparently, at that time, because he left his position as the Crown Prince behind, Julia, who was his fiancée at that time, still can’t get over that fact. Diseum's sister, Catherine von Prussen, is the Pope of the Ys Holy Nation. Catherine was one of the people who traveled with Merlin and Melinda when they were younger. Catherine was chosen to be Pope some time before the beginning of the series. 

She is the second daughter of Duke Koralle and the Fiancée of Prince August. She claims to have no magical abilities.

Princess May is the 10 year old daughter of King Diseum and August's little sister; she is a big fan of Melida and gets mad at August for not bringing her with him. When she finally is able to learn under Melida and Merlin, she turns out to be a prodigy.

The former general of the Knight Order of the Earlshide Kingdom. He took up residence in the woods after retiring. Michel is a strict instructor, each time he learns that Shin has done something uncommon; he would level up the kind of martial arts training for the latter. Michel was renowned as the Sword Saint.

Sieg is one of the court magicians and Diseum's personal bodyguards. Sieg's good-looking and has an easy-going personality, Siegfried and Christina always argue. He and Shin treat each other as brothers. 

Chris is one of the Imperial Knights and acts as Diseum's escort. She is a kind person but undesirably an unsociable one. Siegfried and Christina often quarrel. Shin views Chris as a big sister.
Karen von Kleine
A daughter of a Baroness who is Thor's fiancée. She is two years older than Thor and everyone else with waist length light brown hair. Due to their differences in height, Karen describes Thor as her little brother and she as the big sister. Thor's head is about chest high on Karen.
Sara von Campbell
A daughter of a Count who is Julius' fiancée. She has blonde hair with blue eyes and described as "looking like a model" (in the web novel), so Shin even thinks of her as a foreign samurai. Sara was initially disappointed in Julius joining the magic division instead of a warrior until he extolled as a hero.
Lilia Jackson
Lilia is a student of the Higher Economics Law Academy and Tony's steady girlfriend. She has a serious personality and idolizes Melida to point that she mimics her style in fashion. Down to her having naturally red hair tied in a pony tail and glasses, just like how Melida is seen in some of the paintings of her. Unlike other females, she rejects Tony's advances but changes her mind when receiving honorary.

Demonoids
 

The oldest child of a Count, he is an arrogant noble-class student who considers anyone not noble unworthy. Kurt tries to use his status as leverage to get what he wants, which is against the school rules and royal law. For being placed in A-class, he is jealous of Shin, thinking he cheated to become the top student and taking a position in S-class that should belong to him. However, he was not always this way, but after a visit to Oliver's lab, he started acting like this. His hatred and influence stem from Oliver causing him to become a demonoid who attacks the school, forcing Shin to kill him in order to protect the campus. After Kurt's death, the House of Rietsburg was at first under observation but after Schtrom's confession that he had used Kurt as a guinea pig, they were not charged with any crimes and were treated as victims instead. Despite this, his father who was the Vice Minister of the Finance Bureau resigned in grief. 

Oliver is the quintessential villain of the series who is a demonoid with the appearance of a young man with long silver hair and red eyes. Former known as Oliveira von Schtradius head Duke of a royal family from the Bluesphere Empire. He was a devoted husband to his pregnant wife Aria, and spent his time in relation with commoners and Earlshide's nobles, improving his citizens' livelihood. The admiration ignites jealousy to feudal lords having to prohibit people from migrating there, which evidently did not concern them. The lords framed Oliver as a human abductor that led the citizens into burning his house and killing his wife. Despite the citizens begging for Oliver's forgiveness after realizing they were duped, he in his midst of despair demonized and unleash a fiery magic explosion, wiping out the whole territory. He poses as a middle school professor in Earlshide to concoct illicit research. After concluding his experiment of demonizing Kurt a success, and coincidentally facing Shin in a one-on-one match, Oliver takes revenge in overthrowing the Bluesphere Empire and transforming the citizens into demonoids who share his principles. Regardless of having no further goals, Oliver attempts to erase Shin, seeing him as his greatest threat.

 The Bluesphere Empire's former captain of the Intelligence Department and spymaster. Despite his callous and calculating demeanor, Zest cared for all of his subordinates' well-being and the families of the deceased. Zest originally served higher-ups consistently to request aid and support, until finding the nobles tormenting a young sister of a deceased subordinate of his, just to save themselves from expenses; this came to a head when Oliver offered him and his loyal subordinates the means to become demonoids to punish those who have wronged them. Feeding false information to initiate a war against the Earlshide Kingdom so that Oliver could usurp the Empire with all defenses down, this plan was ultimately successful. When Oliver showed disinterest in doing anything else; however, after learning about Oliver's fight with Shin, Zest grew concerned that someone can withstand Oliver. Behind Oliver's back, Zest decided to go after Shin or demonize him over to their side.

Oliver's retainer whom he took in because of her resemblance to his late wife. Miria is a commoner and worked as an exceptional hunter until she rejected a noble's marriage proposal which resulted in her family getting burned down in greed. Coincidentally, Oliver killed the evil nobles involved and rescued Miria. She tends to Oliver's injuries following his fight with Shin. She is in love with Oliver and one day wants to have a child with him; however, Oliver seems not to reciprocate those feelings back. She willingly chose to be a demonoid and has had combat training and can keep up with Shin in a fight.

A demonoid primarily part of Zest's division.
Amelia
A human-turned-demon who can slash her adversaries in an instant. Her forte in embedding steel wires with invisibility magic comes from her time as a hunter. In those days, she was part of the Bluesphere Empire Hunter Association in exterminating herds of demon beasts, though treated indifferently by males. One day, Amelia and her party members discover that their chief client was auctioning slave girls, especially her long-lost younger sister Rinon. After slaughtering the wicked nobles, Amelia became a fugitive and ends Rinon's life at her request. When the war against the Ultimate Magicians breakout, Amelia is seen at a fort then goes head-to-head with Maria. She remarks that nobles are unwilling to help anyone, to which Maria pities her. Maria overturns her in defeat and Amelia dies with pride.

Media

Light novel
Tsuyoshi Yoshioka originally started the series as a web novel. The series was acquired for print publication by Enterbrain, who published the first light novel on July 30, 2015.

Manga
A manga adaptation, illustrated by Shunsuke Ogata began serialization on Kadokawa Shoten's Young Ace Up website since March 2016. Twenty-one tankōbon volumes have been released as of February 10, 2023.

A spin-off manga illustrated by Shūji Nishizawa, titled Wise Man's Grandchild SP, began serialization in the Young Ace Up website in July 2019. The spin-off is centered around May von Earlshide.

Anime
An anime adaptation of the series was announced in September 2017. The anime, which was later confirmed to air on television, was directed by Masafumi Tamura and written by Tatsuya Takahashi, featuring animation by Silver Link with character designs by Yuki Sawairi and music by Kow Otani. The series aired from April 10 to June 26, 2019 on AT-X, ABC, Tokyo MX and BS11. i☆Ris performed the series' opening theme song "Ultimate☆Magic", while Nanami Yoshi sang the series' ending theme song "Attoteki Vivid Days." 

Funimation licensed the series and produced an English dub. Following Sony's acquisition of Crunchyroll, the dub was moved to Crunchyroll.

Notes

References

External links
 at Shōsetsuka ni Narō 
 
 

2019 anime television series debuts
2015 Japanese novels
Anime and manga based on light novels
AT-X (TV network) original programming
Crunchyroll anime
Famitsu Bunko
Fiction about reincarnation
Isekai anime and manga
Isekai novels and light novels
Japanese webcomics
Kadokawa Dwango franchises
Kadokawa Shoten manga
Light novels
Light novels first published online
Seinen manga
Shōsetsuka ni Narō
Silver Link
Webcomics in print